Stenoma hyacinthitis is a moth in the family Depressariidae. It was described by Edward Meyrick in 1930. It is found in Guyana.

The wingspan is about 16 mm. The forewings are dark greyish-violet with the veins posteriorly marked with very fine lines of whitish-ochreous scales not reaching the margin. The plical and second discal stigmata are indicated by ochreous-whitish dots or marks on each side and there is a whitish dot on the dorsum at one-third, as well as a short curved oblique ochreous-whitish streak from the costa at one-third, and the costal edge whitish from this to two-thirds. A whitish-ochreous marginal line is found around the apical fourth of the costa and termen to the tornus. The hindwings are rather dark grey.

References

Moths described in 1930
Taxa named by Edward Meyrick
Stenoma